Puncturella noachina, common name the diluvian puncturella, is a species of sea snail, a marine gastropod mollusk in the family Fissurellidae, the keyhole limpets.

Description

Distribution

References

 Adam, W. (1934). Notes sur les Céphalopodes: 5. Ozaena cirrhosa (Lamarck, 1798) sur la côte belge [Notes on the cephalopods: 5. Ozaena cirrhosa (Lamarck, 1798) at the Belgian coast]. Bull. Mus. royal d'Hist. Nat. Belg./Med. Kon. Natuurhist. Mus. Belg. 10(43): 1–3

External links
  Serge GOFAS, Ángel A. LUQUE, Joan Daniel OLIVER,José TEMPLADO & Alberto SERRA (2021) - The Mollusca of Galicia Bank (NE Atlantic Ocean); European Journal of Taxonomy 785: 1–114

Fissurellidae
Molluscs described in 1771
Taxa named by Carl Linnaeus